Ruben Sosa Ardaiz (born 25 April 1966) is a Uruguayan former professional football forward. He was a member of the Uruguay national team and a plethora of clubs around the world.

Club career
Born in Montevideo, Sosa started his career in Danubio at the age of 15, being one of the youngest footballers to play in the Uruguayan First Division. He played for Danubio from 1982 to 1985, when he was transferred to Spain's Real Zaragoza. With this club, Ruben Sosa won the Copa del Rey in 1986, scoring in the final against FC Barcelona.

After playing for Zaragoza, Ruben Sosa was transferred to Italy's S.S. Lazio, staying for four years before being sold to Internazionale, where he reached his greatest form as a football player. He was Inter's leading goal scorer in the 1992–93 and 1993–94 seasons, winning the UEFA Cup in 1994. However, the arrival of Dennis Bergkamp in the Summer of 1993, led to splits within the Inter camp, and as a result Sosa left Serie A in the summer of 1995.

After years of success in Uruguay, Spain and Italy, Ruben Sosa played for Germany's Borussia Dortmund, winning the Bundesliga title in 1995–96.

When he left Borussia Dortmund, he returned to Spain to play for CD Logroñés. After a couple of months playing for the team, Ruben Sosa decided to leave in order to make his dream come true: he wanted to play for his favourite team in Uruguay, famous Nacional. At Nacional, Sosa won the Uruguayan League in 1998, 2000 and 2001, becoming one of the fans' heroes.

In 2002, he left Nacional to play in China's Shanghai Shenhua. In 2003, Shanghai won the Chinese Jia-A League title, but the club was stripped of the title in 2013 for match fixing.

In 2004, he returned to Nacional, this time as assistant coach, winning the 2005 league title.

International career
With the Uruguay national team, Sosa won the Copa América in 1987 and 1995, and he played at the 1990 FIFA World Cup in Italy; he also managed a runners-up medal at the 1989 Copa América, where he was named the tournament's best player, and later took part at the 1993 Copa América.

Style of play
Nicknamed El Principito (The Little Prince) by Uruguayan fans, Sosa was a quick, creative, talented, agile, and powerful left-footed forward, with good skills, control, and explosive acceleration. A diminutive footballer with a stocky physique, he was usually deployed as a second striker, although he was also capable of playing as a main striker or even as a winger, as he was capable of both scoring and creating goals. He was known in particular for his spectacular efforts and thunderous free kicks. A complete forward, who could shoot, volley, dribble, pass with precision, and hold up the ball to create chances for teammates, his attributes made him one of the best strikers in Europe during his prime. He is considered by many to be one of the best Uruguayan forwards of the last thirty years, alongside Luis Suárez, Enzo Francescoli, Carlos Aguilera, Álvaro Recoba, Daniel Fonseca, Diego Forlán, and Rubén Paz.

Post-retirement
Nowadays, Ruben Sosa works for Nacional as assistant coach, but he also played for a Second Division team in Uruguay, Racing Club de Montevideo in 2006.

Career statistics

Honours
Danubio
Liguilla Pre-Libertadores de América: 1983

Real Zaragoza
Copa del Rey: 1985–86

Inter
UEFA Cup: 1993–94

Borussia Dortmund
Bundesliga: 1995–96

Nacional
Uruguayan Primera División: 1998, 2000, 2001

Uruguay
Copa América: 1987, 1995

Individual
CONMEBOL Copa América Most Valuable Player of the Tournament: 1989
Pirata d'Oro (Internazionale Player Of The Year): 1993
Uruguayan Primera División Top scorer: 1998
Copa Libertadores Top scorer: 1999

References

External links
TD.com profile 

1966 births
Living people
Footballers from Montevideo
Uruguayan footballers
Uruguayan people of Spanish descent
Association football forwards
Uruguayan Primera División players
La Liga players
Bundesliga players
Serie A players
Danubio F.C. players
Real Zaragoza players
CD Logroñés footballers
S.S. Lazio players
Inter Milan players
Borussia Dortmund players
Club Nacional de Football players
Shanghai Shenhua F.C. players
Racing Club de Montevideo players
Uruguay international footballers
Uruguay under-20 international footballers
Uruguayan expatriate footballers
Expatriate footballers in Spain
Expatriate footballers in Italy
Expatriate footballers in Germany
1990 FIFA World Cup players
1987 Copa América players
1989 Copa América players
1993 Copa América players
Uruguayan expatriate sportspeople in China
1995 Copa América players
Expatriate footballers in China
UEFA Cup winning players